Charity Wayua, is a Kenyan chemist and researcher, who serves as a Corporate Strategy Associate at International Business Machines (IBM), based in the Greater New York City area.

Background and education
Charity attended Alliance Girls High School, in the town of Kikuyu, in Kiambu County, were she obtained her High School Diploma, in 2002. She holds a Bachelor of Science degree in Chemistry, from Xavier University in the United States, obtained in 2007. Her Doctor of Philosophy degree in Medicinal and Pharmaceutical Chemistry, was awarded in 2011, by Purdue University, in the state of Indiana, United States.

Her studies in the United States were sponsored by scholarships awarded by the Zawadi Africa Education Fund, founded and supported by Susan Mboya, a daughter of the late Tom Mboya, one of Kenya's founding fathers. The Zawadi Fund, an American 501(c)3 non-profit, sponsors academically gifted, disadvantaged rural girls in Kenya, to study in American universities, then return to Kenya and contribute to national development.

She later married Peter Ayiro who is currently working as a German teacher at a her alma mater, Alliance Girls' High School.

Work experience
For a period of two years following her undergraduate degree, Charity taught undergraduate chemistry as a teaching assistant, at Purdue University, at West Lafayette, Indiana, until August 2009.

Following the completion of her doctoral studies, she was hired by IBM as  research scientist for the Africa region, based in Nairobi, the capital city of Kenya.

The team of researchers that she leads are charged with developing "commercially viable technologies" that improve how governments work and serve their citizens. The work her team carried out in collaboration with the Kenyan government, between 2013 and 2014, is credited with improving Kenya's ranking on the World Bank annual Ease of Doing Business ranking, advancing by 21 spots.

In June 2018, Charity Wayua was promoted to Corporate Strategy Associate at IBM, and continues to work both in Nairobi, Kenya and at corporate headquarters in Armonk, New York State.

Other considerations
In September 2018, Business Daily Africa, a Kenyan, English language, daily newspaper, named Charity Wayua, among the "Top 40 Under 40 Women in Kenya in 2018".

See also
 Gladys Ngetich
 Sianto Sitawa
 Cynthia Wandia
 Kagure Wamunyu

References

External links
Profile of Dr Charity Wayua As of 2017.

Living people
1985 births
People from Nairobi
Kamba people
Kenyan scientists
Xavier University alumni
Purdue University College of Pharmacy alumni
Alumni of Alliance Girls High School
21st-century Kenyan women
21st-century Kenyan women scientists
21st-century Kenyan scientists
Kenyan women chemists